ATA Brasil (Atlântico Transporte Aéreo) was a low-cost airline based in Recife, Brazil. It operated domestic passenger and cargo services. Its main base was Guararapes International Airport, Recife.

History 

The airline was established in 2001 as an air taxi company in Recife. After being purchased from its original owners, it moved to Fortaleza in 2004, converted its air operators certificate to commercial operator and started operations on 26 May 2004. The company ceased its operations in early 2006.

Fleet 

The ATA Brasil fleet consisted of the following aircraft (at March 2007):

1 Boeing 727-200F
1 Boeing 737-200C

See also
List of defunct airlines of Brazil

References

External links
Aviation Photos: ATA Brasil at Airliners.net
Aviation Photos: ATA Brasil at Jetphotos.net

Defunct airlines of Brazil
Airlines established in 2001
Airlines disestablished in 2006